Mahanga is a village and Community Development Block in Indian state of Odisha. Mahanga police station serves the village.

Mahanga is a part of the Mahanga (Vidhan Sabha constituency) of the Odisha Legislative Assembly.

Villages
The following is the list of villages in the Mahanga block.

References

Villages in Cuttack district